The historically important Murphy Branch is the westernmost part of what was the Western North Carolina Railroad, later the Richmond and Danville, Southern Railway, the Norfolk Southern Railway (NS) and today the Blue Ridge Southern Railroad. The branch runs between Asheville, North Carolina in the east and Murphy in the west.

I-40 from Asheville to Canton and US Route 74, also known as the Great Smoky Mountains Expressway, from Canton to Murphy, roughly parallel the railway. Grades on the Murphy Branch exceed 4.0% in two places.

History

It was constructed with convict lease labor between 1881 and 1894 under the charter of the Western North Carolina Railroad. The Murphy Branch was important to the development of southwestern North Carolina in the late 19th and early 20th centuries. It opened up the isolated and rural mountains west of Asheville to the outside world, allowing easy travel and improved commerce. These tracks stimulated the development of Western North Carolina.

In the 1980s, Norfolk Southern decided to close the Murphy Branch west of Sylva because of declining freight traffic. The NCDOT purchased the branch west of Dillsboro in 1988, the first purchase under NCDOT's program to preserve rail corridors. It granted trackage rights between Dillsboro and Andrews to the Great Smoky Mountains Railroad (GSMR), a tourist excursion railroad that also provides freight service. In 1996, the NCDOT sold the Dillsboro-Andrews portion of the Murphy Branch to the GSMR.

In April 2014, Norfolk Southern announced that it would be selling the Asheville-Dillsboro leg of the Murphy Branch to Watco, a short-line railroad headquartered in Pittsburg, Kansas. A new North Carolina Limited Liability Company was established and named the Blue Ridge Southern Railroad to manage this. The deal closed and operations began on 26 July 2014.

The GSMR continues to own the Dillsboro to Andrews leg, and operates all but the westernmost portion between Hewitt and Andrews. The NCDOT continues to own the tracks between Andrews and Murphy; this section has been out of service continuously since 1985. The next year CSX abandoned and removed its connecting line in 1986 from Murphy southwestward into Georgia, formerly a line of the Louisville and Nashville.

Towns, cities and communities along the route 

 Asheville (Beginning point)
 Murphy Junction
 Emma
 Enka
 Hominy
 Candler
 Coburn
 Canton
 Clyde
 Waynesville
 Hazelwood
 Saunook
 Balsam Gap (junction of US 74 and the Blue Ridge Parkway)
 Balsam
 Willits-Ochre Hill
 Addie
 Beta
 Sylva
 Dillsboro
 Wilmot
 Whittier
 Ela (interchange with Appalachian Railway, 1907-1935,)
 Bryson City (Bryson City Depot)
 Almond
 Wesser
 Hewitt 
 Nantahala (end point today for the GSMR)
 Topton (near the junction with the former Graham County Railroad,)
 Andrews (end point of the GSMR until 2010)
 Marble
 Murphy

Commodities shipped/received
The Murphy Branch still plays a vital role in the industrial economy of western North Carolina. The rail line serves two paper mills: Evergreen Packaging in Canton and Jackson Paper Manufacturing Company in Sylva. Chemicals used in the making of epsom salt are delivered to Giles Chemical in Waynesville, and there are several small concrete mixing facilities that receive sand. Woodchips are loaded at T&S Hardwoods in Addie, about 4 miles east Sylva. Liquefied petroleum gas is delivered to a transfer facility a few miles outside of Sylva in the community of Beta.

See also

Blue Ridge Southern Railroad
Great Smoky Mountains Railroad
Southern Railway

References

Further reading

External links 
 Great Smoky Mountains Railroad
 Blue Ridge Southern Railroad
 Travel WNC, WCU Digital Collections - Pictures of Murphy Branch in 1910s

Southern Railway (U.S.)
Norfolk Southern Railway lines
Transportation in Appalachia
Transportation in Swain County, North Carolina
Transportation in Jackson County, North Carolina
Transportation in Cherokee County, North Carolina
Transportation in Graham County, North Carolina
Transportation in Haywood County, North Carolina
Transportation in Buncombe County, North Carolina
Landmarks in North Carolina